Digi-Comp may refer to:

 Digi-Comp I, a mechanical toy computer without marbles
 Digi-Comp II, a marble-based mechanical toy computer
 Dr. NIM, a game of Nim based on the Digi-Comp mechanism